Duncan Arnolda (born 17 January 1975) is a Sri Lankan former cricketer. He played in 110 first-class and 56 List A matches between 1994/95 and 2009/10. He made his Twenty20 debut on 17 August 2004, for Burgher Recreation Club in the 2004 SLC Twenty20 Tournament.

References

External links
 

1975 births
Living people
Sri Lankan cricketers
Antonians Sports Club cricketers
Badureliya Sports Club cricketers
Burgher Recreation Club cricketers
Colombo Cricket Club cricketers